Gary van Ginkel Botha (born 12 October 1981 in Pretoria, South Africa) is a former rugby union player, that professionally played as a hooker between 2002 and 2013.

In 2015, he was appointed as a technical consultant for the Blue Bulls forwards.

Botha has won the Currie Cup with the Blue Bulls, the Super 14 title with the Bulls and was part of the Springbok squad that won the 2007 Rugby World Cup.

Botha made his debut for the Springboks in 2005, in a match against Australia at the Loftus Versfeld Stadium in Pretoria, replacing captain John Smit.

Botha has played rugby league for the South African Rhinos at the age of 18.

Honours 
South Africa Under-21
World Cup: 2002

Blue Bulls
Currie Cup: 2002, 2003, 2004, 2006 (Shared Blue Bulls/Free State Cheetahs)

Bulls
Super Rugby: 2007, 2010

South Africa
World Cup: 2007

References

External links

 at Scrum.com
 profile at sarugby.net
 
 scrum.com stats
Bulls profile

1981 births
Living people
Blue Bulls players
Bulls (rugby union) players
Harlequin F.C. players
Rugby league players from Gauteng
Rugby union hookers
Rugby union players from Pretoria
Sharks (rugby union) players
South Africa international rugby union players
South African rugby league players
South African rugby union players
Stade Toulousain players
University of Pretoria alumni